Shingle Run may refer to:

Shingle Run (Huntington Creek),  in Luzerne County, Pennsylvania
Shingle Run (West Branch Run), in Columbia County, Pennsylvania
Shingle Run (Dark Shade Creek)  in Somerset County, Pennsylvania
Shingle Run (Bear Creek)  im Lycoming County, Pennsylvania

See also
Shingle Creek (disambiguation)
Shingle (disambiguation)